A trigeminal ganglion (also known as: Gasserian ganglion, semilunar ganglion, or Gasser's ganglion) is the sensory ganglion of each trigeminal nerve (CN V). The trigeminal ganglion is located within the trigeminal cave (Meckel's cave), a cavity formed by dura mater.

Anatomy
The trigeminal ganglion contains cell bodies of the pseudo-unipolar sensory neurons of the trigeminal nerve which extend their axons both distally/peripherally into the three divisions of the trigeminal nerve on the one end, and proximally/centrally to the brainstem on the other end; the trigeminal root extends from the trigeminal ganglion to the ventrolateral aspect of the pons.

The trigeminal ganglion is situated within the trigeminal cave (or Meckel's cave), a cerebrospinal fluid-filled cavity formed by a double layer of dura mater overlying the trigeminal impression near the apex of the petrous part of the temporal bone.

Structure 
The trigeminal ganglion is somewhat crescent-shaped, with its convexity directed anterolaterally. From its convex border arise the ophthalmic nerve (V1), maxillary nerve (V2), and mandibular nerve (V3).

The ganglion receives, on its medial side, filaments from the carotid plexus of the sympathetic. It issues minute branches to the tentorium cerebelli, and the dura mater in the middle cranial fossa.

Relations 
Medially to the trigeminal ganglion are the internal carotid artery, and the posterior part of the cavernous sinus.

The motor root of the trigeminal nerve passes beneath the trigeminal ganglion to exit the skull through the foramen ovale. The greater superficial petrosal nerve lies underneath the trigeminal ganglion.

Clinical significance

Herpes virus dormancy 
After recovery from a primary herpes infection, the virus is not cleared from the body, but rather lies dormant in a non-replicating state within the trigeminal ganglion.

Lesions 
If the trigeminal ganglion is damaged, by infection or surgery, it gives rise to the trigeminal trophic syndrome, which involves paresthesias and anesthesia, and may lead to erosions of the nasal ala.

Ablation in trigeminal neuralgia 
The thermocoagulation or injection of glycerol into the trigeminal ganglion has been used in the treatment of trigeminal neuralgia.

Other animals

Rodents
In rodents, the trigeminal ganglion is important as it is the first part of the pathway from the whiskers to the brain. Cell bodies of the whisker primary afferents are found here. These afferents are mechanoreceptor cells that fire in response to whisker deflection.

There are around 26,000–43,000 cell bodies in rodent trigeminal ganglion. It is possible that there are two distinct (or perhaps continuous) populations of cells having slowly and rapidly adapting responses to stimuli.

It is found at the base of the skull and projects to trigeminal brain stem areas including principalis, spinal trigeminal nucleus, interpolaris, and caudalis.

Additional images

References

External links
 Diagram at University of Manitoba
 Diagram (as "Gasserian Ganglion") at frca.co.uk
 
 
 

Sensory ganglia
Cranial nerves